Second Language Research is a peer-reviewed academic journal in the field of linguistics, concerned foremost with second language acquisition and second-language performance. Each year, one special issue is published, devoted to some current topic. It was established in 1985 and is published quarterly by SAGE Publications. The current editors-in-chief are Silvina Montrul and Roumyana Slabakova.

According to the Journal Citation Reports, the journal has a 2020 impact factor of 2.178.

See also

Applied Linguistics
ITL – International Journal of Applied Linguistics
Journal of Second Language Writing
The Modern Language Journal

References

External links 
 

Language education journals
English-language journals
Publications established in 1985
Quarterly journals
SAGE Publishing academic journals